Argonemertes is a genus of nemertean worms belonging to the family Prosorhochmidae. It may be transferred to the family Plectonemertidae.  It contains the following species:

 Argonemertes australiensis (Dendy, 1892)
 Argonemertes dendyi (Dakin, 1915)
 Argonemertes hillii (Hett, 1924)
 Argonemertes stocki (Moore, 1975)

All four species are terrestrial animals.

References

Prosorhochmidae
Nemertea genera